Alf Nicolay Dannevig (1 May 1886 – 12 September 1960) was a Norwegian marine biologist who specialized on fish, and a local politician. He was the son of sea captain Gunder Mathiesen Dannevig, and the father of writer Birger Dannevig. He managed the hatchery Flødevigen Utklekningsanstalt from 1911 to 1956. His research included cod, salmon, trout, cultivation of lobster, and the marine biology of Skagerrak. He served as Mayor of Hisøy in 1945 and from 1948 to 1960.

References

1886 births
1960 deaths
People from Arendal
20th-century Norwegian zoologists
Norwegian marine biologists
University of Oslo alumni
Mayors of places in Aust-Agder